FabricLive.55 is a 2011 DJ mix album by DJ Marky. The album was released as part of the FabricLive Mix Series.

Track listing

References

External links
Fabric: FabricLive.55

Fabric (club) albums
2011 compilation albums